Maxim Bouchard (born September 18, 1990) is a Canadian diver who competes for the national team.

In June 2016, Bouchard was named to the Canadian Olympic team.

Achievements 
 2013 - Summer Senior National Championships - Bronze on 10m, Gold on 10m synchro (Gagné)
 2013 - Puerto Rico Grand Prix - Silver on 10m synchro (Gagné)
 2013 - Winter Senior National Championships - Gold on 10m & 10m synchro (Gagné)
 2012 - Canadian Diving Trials - 4th on 3m & 10m
 2012 - Winter Senior National Championships - Bronze on 10m
 2008 - Speedo Junior National Championships - Silver on 3m, Bronze on 1m & 10m
 2007 - Speedo Junior National Championships - Silver on 1m & 3m
 2006 - Speedo Junior National Championships - Silver on 1m, Gold on 3m, Silver on 10m
 2005 - Pan Am Junior Diving Championships - Gold on 1m & 10m, Silver on 3m
 2005 - Speedo Junior National Championships - Gold on 1m, Silver on 3m, Gold on 10m
 2005 - Canada Cup - 21st on 10m
 2004 - Speedo Junior National Championships - Gold on 3m & 10m, Silver on 1m

References

External links
Diving Plongeon Canada
Official website

1990 births
Living people
Canadian male divers
People from LaSalle, Quebec
Divers from Montreal
Divers at the 2016 Summer Olympics
Olympic divers of Canada
Divers at the 2015 Pan American Games
Pan American Games competitors for Canada